Amir Ibragimov (born 27 June 2007) is a footballer who plays as a forward for Manchester United. Born in Russia, he has represented England at youth international level.

Club career
Born in Dagestan, Russia, Ibragimov's family moved to England when he was eleven years old, and he started his career in the academy of Sheffield United. 

He later moved to Manchester United, captaining both the under-14 and under-15 sides during his progression through the academy. While playing for the Manchester United under-15 side against Tottenham in March 2022, Ibragimov won a penalty after dribbling into the Tottenham penalty area. However, as he did not believe he was fouled, he passed the resulting penalty into the Tottenham goalkeeper's hands, a gesture which garnered national attention. He signed his first contract, a pre-scholarship deal, with the club in August 2022.

On 21 January 2023, having scored for Manchester United's under-16 team in their 1–0 win against Liverpool's under-16s, he appeared for Manchester United's under-18 team in the same day, featuring in a 3–2 win, with Liverpool being the opponents again.

International career
Ibragimov is eligible to represent Russia through birth, and England, having lived in the country from the age of eleven. He made his first appearance for the England under-15s in a 3–2 win over Belgium in February 2023. He remains eligible to represent Russia.

Personal life
Ibragimov is a Muslim, and footage of him reciting the Quran at the Trafford Centre in Manchester went viral in March 2023.

His older brother, Ibragim, is a professional MMA fighter, while younger brother, Gazi, plays football for Manchester United's youth teams.

References

2007 births
Living people
Sportspeople from Dagestan
English footballers
England youth international footballers
English people of Dagestani descent
Russian people of Dagestani descent
Russian emigrants to the United Kingdom
Association football forwards
Sheffield United F.C. players
Manchester United F.C. players